Jewish Rhode Island is a now monthly newspaper that serves the Jewish communities of the state of Rhode Island.  The newspaper's origins were in 1929, then a weekly called The Jewish Herald until 1958, then called Rhode Island Herald until 1989.  It merged with a monthly Jewish publication called The Voice, for a period adopting the name The Jewish Voice & Herald.

References 

Jewish newspapers published in the United States
Newspapers published in Rhode Island